The 1919–20 Lancashire Cup was the twelfth competition for this regional rugby league competition. The final was contested between the same finalists as the Spring tournament, but the result was reversed as  Oldham beat  Rochdale Hornets at The Willows,  Salford  by a score of 7-0. The attendance at the final was 19,000 and receipts £1,615.

Background 
The number of teams entering this competition was again 12 with four byes in the first round

Competition and results

Round 1  
Involved  4 matches (with four byes) and 12 clubs

Round 2 – quarterfinals

Round 3 – semifinals

Final

Teams and scorers 

Scoring - Try = three (3) points - Goal = two (2) points - Drop goal = two (2) points

The road to success

Notes and comments 
 1 The Willows was the home ground of Salford.

See also 
1919–20 Northern Rugby Football Union season

References

1919 2
Lancashire Cup 2